Captain Basil Edgar Baily FRIBA (14 January 1869 – 1942) was an architect based in Nottingham.  Much of his earlier work had to do with nearby churches.

Background and family
Basil Baily was born in Newark-on-Trent, Nottinghamshire, son of the architect Charles Baily. He married first May Clayton and lived in Bulcote Manor. He went on to marry Eleanor Corah in 1928. On his death in 1942, he was living at Bowyers Court, Wisborough Green, Suffolk.

Architect career
He was articled in 1885 in the offices of Martin and Hardy, Brewing and Malting engineers, then Sir Ernest George and Harold Ainsworth Peto. He worked independently in Newark-on-Trent from 1891, and then in partnership with Arthur Brewill from 1894 until 1922. He was awarded the Fellowship of the Royal Institute of British Architects on 2 December 1901.

Later he formed a partnership with Albert Edgar Eberlin as Baily & Eberlin.

Buildings

New Bolsover model village, Old Bolsover, Derbyshire 1891–1894
St John's Church, Colston Bassett 1892
Albert Mill, Gamble Street, Nottingham 1893
Church of the Holy Rood, Edwalton 1894
104–106 Lenton Boulevard, Nottingham 1895–1897
St Columba's Church, Nottingham 1896, originally Presbyterian, then Church of Christ Scientist, now a Sikh Temple
Bardencroft, Tweed Street, Saltburn 1897 
West Bridgford Presbyterian Church 1898
Turkish Baths, Upper Parliament Street, Nottingham 1898 (demolished 1962)
St John the Baptist, South Witham, Lincolnshire 1898–1901
29 and 31, (Ram Hotel), Long Row, Nottingham 1899
Creswell Church of England Infants School, Elmton Road, Elmton, Bolsover, Derbyshire 1900
Long Eaton Wesleyan Methodist Church 1903–1904
Carriageway Block, Queens Road, Nottingham 1908
Derby Road drill hall, Nottingham, Nottingham (later used by the Post Office, now residential accommodation) 1910–1912
Nottingham Road Methodist Church, Mansfield 1913
Pedestrian Bridge over Houndsgate, Nottingham 1920–1921
War Memorial at Burton Joyce 1920
Albert Ball Memorial Homes, Lenton, Nottingham 1921
Memorial to Captain Albert Ball VC in Nottingham Castle 1921
Memorial to Robin Hood Battalion of the Sherwood Foresters in the chancel of St Mary's Church, Nottingham 1921
Extension to Nottingham and Nottinghamshire Bank onto Pelham Street, Nottingham 1924–25
Alterations to Brackenhurst Hall, Nottingham University
The Duke of Devonshire public house, Carlton Road, Nottingham 1931 (with Eberlin)
County Tavern, Nottingham, now Cock and Hoop, Nottingham 1933 (with Eberlin)
Royal Children public house, Nottingham 1933–1934 (with Eberlin)

Military career
Baily was promoted to Second Lieutenant in the Robin Hood Rifles on 11 December 1895, then Captain in 1900. He was appointed a temporary Major on 19 December 1914. He was injured in combat in April 1915 and lost a hand.

References

 
1869 births
1942 deaths
Military personnel from Nottinghamshire
Fellows of the Royal Institute of British Architects
Architects from Nottingham
People from Newark-on-Trent
Sherwood Foresters officers
British Army personnel of World War I